Taghkanic Creek is a  tributary to Claverack Creek in Columbia County, New York, in the United States. Via Claverack Creek and Stockport Creek, it is part of the Hudson River watershed. Its source is in the town of Hillsdale, and it passes through the towns of Copake, Taghkanic, and Livingston before terminating at Claverack Creek in the town of Greenport.

History
Taghkanic or Taughannock is the Native American name for this stream, meaning "forest wilderness" or "in the trees".  Other sources cite the fact that the stream has its source on the opposite side of the mountain in Copake through which it flows in an underground stream.

Tributaries
 Mud Creek
 Snydam Creek
 Chrysler Pond Outlet

See also
List of rivers of New York

References

External links
Public Fishing Rights Maps: Taghkanic Creek

Rivers of Columbia County, New York
Rivers of New York (state)
Tributaries of the Hudson River